Express on Fire (34th Express) is a 1981 Soviet disaster film directed by Andrei Malyukov.

Cast

References

External links

Films directed by Andrei Malyukov
Russian disaster films
1980s disaster films
Mosfilm films
Soviet drama films
1981 drama films